Hedgewar Smruti Mandir (HSM) is a memorial in Reshimbagh, Nagpur, Maharashtra, India dedicated to K. B. Hedgewar and M. S. Golwalkar, who were the first two leaders of the Hindu nationalist organisation Rashtriya Swayamsevak Sangh (RSS). It was inaugurated in 1962. It was granted tourism status on the recommendation of the Maharashtra Tourism Development Corporation (MTDC) in 2017, but this decision is mired in controversy.

History
K. B. Hedgewar was the founder of the Hindu nationalist organisation Rashtriya Swayamsevak Sangh (RSS); when he died in 1940, his final rites were performed at the RSS headquarters in Reshimbagh, and an unassuming samadhi (memorial) was built there. It was inaugurated on 9 April 1962 (Varsha Pratipada) by M. S. Golwalkar who was Hedgewar's immediate successor. When M. S. Gowalkar died, his memorial was also constructed there. It is made of rare rocks, marble and mosaic. The Dr. Hedgewar Smarak Samiti, an independent society registered under the Societies Act, maintains the memorial. The training camps for RSS volunteers  (Swayamsevaks) in 2017 and 2018 were organised on the premise of the memorial.

Controversy over tourism status
The Nagpur Municipal Corporation (NMC) approved money for the development of the memorial on 12 September 2017. The NMC has proposed construction of a road and a compound wall in Reshimbagh at a cost of  1.37 crore, but this is a controversial decision and has been contested. A public interest litigation was filed to challenge this decision claiming that public money cannot be spent on the development of a private area. Subsequently, it received a C-grade tourism status on the recommendation of the Maharashtra Tourism Development Corporation (MTDC) and the district planning committee. The MTDC added the memorial to a list of places to visit in Nagpur Darshan for the large number of people visiting during Vijayadashami and other occasions. This decision by the MTDC is under court consideration because of the public interest litigation. It is Nagpur's first memorial and 9th location to be granted tourism status.

Notes

References

Tourist attractions in Nagpur
Rashtriya Swayamsevak Sangh
Buildings and structures completed in 1962
Monuments and memorials in Maharashtra
20th-century architecture in India